Bob Koherr  is an American TV director and director and known for directing episodes of Anger Management and various Disney Network multi-cam comedies.

In 1997, Koherr made his directorial debut with the feature film Plump Fiction, a parody film of Quentin Tarantino's Pulp Fiction. Since 2000, he has directed episodes of Anger Management, The Drew Carey Show, Wanda at Large, Still Standing, Freddie, George Lopez, Hannah Montana, Wizards of Waverly Place, Good Luck Charlie, The Suite Life on Deck, Cristela, the pilot for A.N.T. Farm, the pilot for The Thundermans, and the pilot for Jessie, as well as other series.

As an actor, Koherr has guest starred in number of television series namely, Cybill, Party of Five, Nash Bridges, The Pretender, Malcolm in the Middle, Close to Home, Weeds, Seven Days and the feature films Poor White Trash, Parting Glances,  Firehouse Dog and Race to Witch Mountain. He also co-starred in the Comedy Central series Strip Mall opposite Julie Brown.

On September 23, 2008, he married Walter Batt, a Los Angeles-based entertainment attorney.

Filmography

Films

TV

TV Director

References

External links

 https://www.youtube.com/watch?v=B7bbzCeOLKc

American male film actors
American film directors
American male television actors
American television directors
Comedy film directors
Parody film directors
American parodists
Living people
Place of birth missing (living people)
Year of birth missing (living people)
American gay actors
LGBT film directors
LGBT television directors
21st-century LGBT people